Robert Emmet Briscoe (25 September 1894 – 29 May 1969) was an Irish Fianna Fáil politician who served as a Teachta Dála (TD) in the Oireachtas (Irish parliament) from 1927 to 1965.

Family 
Briscoe was a son of Abraham William Briscoe and Ida Yoedicke, both of whom were Lithuanian-Jewish immigrants. The original family name in Lithuania is believed to have been Cherrick or Chasen. His brother Wolfe Tone Briscoe was named after Theobald Wolfe Tone, one of the leaders of the Irish Rebellion of 1798.

Briscoe's father was the proprietor of Lawlor Briscoe, a furniture factory on Ormond Quay which made, refurbished, imported, exported and sold furniture, trading all over Ireland and abroad. Abraham Briscoe – known universally as Pappa – had arrived in Ireland penniless, and made his fortune as a salesman, first as a brush salesman, then of imported tea. He married Ida Yoedicke, daughter of a successful family in Frankfurt, who had left Lithuania and the racist Russian laws limiting Jews from success and a decent life, to live in the more liberal Germany.

Robert and his wife Lily had seven children; only two of their sons, Ben and Joe, remained in Dublin. One of Robert Briscoe's daughters Miriam converted to the Catholic faith and became a Carmelite nun. Ben followed his father into politics, while Joe joined the army at age of 15 (claiming to be 18) in 1945; he retired in 1993 with the rank of commandant.

War of Independence 
Briscoe was active in the Irish Republican Army (IRA) and Sinn Féin during the Irish War of Independence and accompanied Éamon de Valera to America. He spoke for the Sinn Féin cause at public meetings there and was adamant that being a "Hebrew" did not lessen his Irishness. Briscoe was sent by Michael Collins to Germany in 1919 to be the chief agent for procuring arms for the IRA. While in Germany in 1921 Briscoe purchased a small tug boat named Frieda to be used in transporting guns and ammunition to Ireland. On 28 October 1921 the Frieda slipped out to sea with Charles McGuinness at the helm and a German crew with a cargo of 300 guns and 20,000 rounds of ammunition. Other sources cite this shipment as "the largest military shipment ever to reach the I.R.A." consisting of 1500 rifles, 2000 pistols and 1.7 million rounds of ammunition. On 2 November 1921 the Frieda successfully landed its cargo near Waterford harbor.

Eamon Martin, former Chief of Staff of Fianna Éireann, was best man at Briscoe's wedding. They had been close friends during the Irish War of Independence.

Irish Civil War 
In June 1922 during the Irish Civil War, Briscoe was involved in an incident with fellow anti-treaty IRA members who attacked pro-treaty politician Darrell Figgis at his home. They entered the house and assaulted Darrell Figgis, cutting off his well-prized beard in the process. This traumatised Figgis' wife Millie, who had been under the impression Briscoe and his fellow assistants had been coming to kill Darrell. In November 1924 Millie would commit suicide, expressing in a suicide note that she was suffering from depression as a result of the 1922 attack.  Darrell Figgis himself committed suicide in 1926.

In his biography, he recalls an incident of being recognised by a pro-Treaty opponent during the Civil War. Briscoe merely turned and walked away, confident that his enemy would not shoot him in the back.

Dáil Éireann 

Elected to the Dáil in the newly independent Ireland, Briscoe worked with Patrick Little to bring through a law limiting the interest that could be charged by moneylenders – and also, as he wrote, "made it illegal for a married woman to borrow money without the knowledge and consent of her husband, for these foolish ones are always the easiest prey of the moneylenders".

Jewish refugees and Irish neutrality 
During the Second World War, Briscoe, at this time a member of Dáil Éireann, came under close scrutiny from the Irish security services. His support for Zionism and his lobbying on behalf of refugees was considered potentially damaging to the interests of the state by officials from the Department of Justice. Briscoe was an admirer and friend of Ze'ev Jabotinsky and his campaign to liberate the Jews. Between 1939 and 1940, Robert Briscoe along with John Henry Patterson, a former commander of  both the Zion Mule Corps and later the 38th Battalion of the Royal Fusiliers (also known as the Jewish Legion), were involved in fund raising for the Irgun in the USA. Jabotinsky while head of Irgun visited Dublin to receive training in guerrilla warfare tactics against the British under the instruction of Briscoe. During the period Briscoe described himself as the "Chair of Subversive Activity against England". He wished for Ireland to give asylum to Jews fleeing Nazi Germany, but did so discreetly in order not to be accused of compromising the neutrality policy of the Fianna Fáil government. Briscoe notably had a spat with Irish trade envoy to Germany Charles Bewley, who tried to thwart his effort of helping Jewish refugees gaining visas for Ireland during the war.

After the Second World War Briscoe acted as a special advisor to Menachem Begin in the transformation of Irgun from a paramilitary group to a parliamentary political movement in the form of Herut in the new Israeli state; the party later became Likud. Briscoe had already been a key figure in the formation in his own Fianna Fáil party out of the Anti-treaty IRA post Irish independence but not before a bitter Civil War, he prompted Menachem Begin to make the transition immediately after the Altalena Affair in order to avoid a similar civil conflict.

Political career 

He served in Dáil Éireann for 38 years and was elected 12 times in the Dublin South and from 1948, Dublin South-West constituencies – from the 6th Dáil to the 17th Dáil. He retired at the 1965 election, being succeeded by his son, Ben who served for a further 37 years. In 1956, Briscoe became the first Jewish Lord Mayor of Dublin, although he was not the first Jewish Mayor in Ireland. That title belongs to William Annyas, who was elected Mayor of Youghal, County Cork in 1555. Briscoe was Dublin's first Jewish Lord Mayor, although Lewis Wormser Harris was elected Lord Mayor in 1876, but died before assuming office. Briscoe served a one-year term and was re-elected in 1961. After learning of a Jewish Lord Mayor from Dublin, Yogi Berra allegedly said, "Only in America!" His son Ben Briscoe was also a Fianna Fáil TD, and he too served as Lord Mayor of Dublin from 1988 to 1989.

His memoir, For the Life of Me, was published in 1958.

The Emerald Isle Immigration Center in New York has devoted a special award in his name called the Robert Briscoe award. The group celebrates the close relationship between Jewish and Irish communities in New York and honours Jewish New Yorkers who have helped support immigration in the United States. The 2016 Award Winners were Queens Borough President Melinda Katz and Deborah King, director of SEIU 1199's training and employment funds.  Previous winners have included former New York Mayor Ed Koch, former Gov. Eliot Spitzer and U.S. Senator Charles Schumer.

Cultural depictions 
Robert Briscoe's actions during the Irish War of Independence were dramatised in an episode of the American anthology drama television series Playhouse 90 broadcast in 1957 on CBS titled The Fabulous Irishman. In that episode, Briscoe was the main character and was played by Art Carney while David Opatoshu played Briscoe's father (and was credited as "Briscoe's Father" instead of "Abraham Briscoe" which was his actual father's name). The Fabulous Irishman, like most programs at the time, was shown live. Art Carney was praised for his performance as Robert Briscoe in a review was published in The New York Times and another review that also praised Carney's acting was published in The Boston Globe.

References

External links 
 Emerald Isle Immigration center – Annual Briscoe Awards

 

Fianna Fáil TDs
1894 births
1969 deaths
Irish people of Lithuanian-Jewish descent
Irish Republican Army (1919–1922) members
People of the Irish Civil War (Anti-Treaty side)
Jewish Irish politicians
Lord Mayors of Dublin
Members of the 6th Dáil
Members of the 7th Dáil
Members of the 8th Dáil
Members of the 9th Dáil
Members of the 10th Dáil
Members of the 11th Dáil
Members of the 12th Dáil
Members of the 13th Dáil
Members of the 14th Dáil
Members of the 15th Dáil
Members of the 16th Dáil
Members of the 17th Dáil
Presidential appointees to the Council of State (Ireland)
Burials at Dolphins Barn Jewish Cemetery
Irish autobiographers
Jewish non-fiction writers
People educated at St Andrew's College, Dublin
Irish Zionists
Irgun
People from Portobello, Dublin